How Democratic is the American Constitution? (2001, among others) is a book by political scientist Robert A. Dahl that discusses seven "undemocratic" elements of the United States Constitution.

The book defines "democratic" as alignment with the principle of one person, one vote, also known as majority rule.  The author praises the Framers of the Constitution as "men of exceptional talent and virtue" (p. 7) who made admirable progress in the creation of their republican government. But Dahl also points out that innovation and change in democratic techniques and ideals continued even after the Constitution was codified, and the American system has not adopted all of those new ideas. He says that the Founders were partially constrained by public opinion, which included maintenance of the sovereignty of the thirteen states.

Undemocratic elements

The primary undemocratic aspects of the Constitution that the book sets out are:

 Tolerance of slavery – Necessary to ensure the cooperation and participation of the Southern states, and only outlawed after the American Civil War
 Suffrage – The voting rights of women, African-Americans, and Native Americans were either not protected or specifically abridged.  (In 1870, the Fifteenth Amendment prohibited denial of suffrage due to race.  In 1920, the Nineteenth Amendment prohibited denial of suffrage due to sex.  In 1964, the Twenty-Fourth Amendment prohibited poll taxes, which were then being used in some states to discriminate against African-Americans without explicit racial provisions.)
 Election of the president – Article II Section 1 establishes the Electoral College, which gives each state a number of electors proportional to its representation in Congress (which, because each state has two senators, is not proportional to population).  Electors were to be appointed by whatever method the state legislatures chose, and would presumably use their own judgment in choosing a President.  In modern times, most states use a "winner take all" system to allocate the votes of their electors based on the outcome of the popular vote within that state, but the allocation of votes among the states is unchanged.
 Representation in the Senate –  Each state gets two senators, regardless of population.  This is known as the Connecticut Compromise, and was incorporated into the Constitution to secure the continued participation of the smaller states. (also references Sizing Up the Senate by Frances Lee and Bruce Oppenheimer)
 Election of senators – Article I, Section 3 declared that senators were to be appointed directly by state legislatures.  In 1913, the Seventeenth Amendment changed the system so that senators were popularly elected in staggered statewide races.
 Judicial power – In the United States, judge(s) have the power to rule unconstitutional any law or regulation, even if duly approved by the legislature and signed by the president.  Judges are appointed (not elected) for life with a high threshold for removal, which makes them independent.  Dahl feels that the judiciary has used its rather unconstrained authority to essentially make national policy through judicial fiat.
 Limitations on Congressional power – As interpreted by the judiciary, the Constitution reserves sovereignty in many domains of regulation to the states.  The powers of Congress are limited to a specific list. From 1895 until the Sixteenth Amendment was ratified in 1913, court interpretations of constitutional requirements for "direct" taxes made a federal income tax impracticable, limiting the revenue available to the federal government. During the Lochner era, the Supreme Court interpreted the economic powers of Congress very narrowly, giving the federal government very little power to affect the economy.  Modern judicial interpretation has allowed the federal government to have a much greater influence over the economy.

What kind of constitution is best?

Dahl considers the question of whether the details of the American Constitution, as amended and practiced in modern times, are superior or inferior to the constitutional systems of other stable democracies.  His criteria for evaluation are:

 Political stability (that is, remaining democratic)
 Effective protection of democratic rights
 Democratic fairness
 Fosters consensus building
 Promotes effective problem solving

Maintaining stability

Dahl supposes that there are certain conditions which make it easier to maintain a democracy in a given country.  He writes that these seem to include "the effective control by elected leaders over the military and police, a political culture supportive of democratic beliefs, and a relatively well-functioning economic order, among others." 

Dahl proposes that highly unfavorable circumstances cause instability, no matter the constitutional systems.  Under highly favorable circumstances, a country may remain democratic given a range of possible constitutional arrangements, whether or not the system is the best kind for promoting stability.  In mixed conditions, he postulates, the details of a country's constitution may tip the balance between stability and undesirable changes, such as conversion to dictatorship.

Dahl points out that the superiority of presidential vs. parliamentary systems in this regard is disputed*, and that correlation between breakdown and presidential systems in the "third world" may not be indicative of a causal relationship.  He seems to take the position that different systems may be better suited to the peculiar circumstances of different countries. (p. 96)

* In favor of parliamentary systems, he cites: Juan Linz and Arturo Valenzuela, eds., The Failure of Presidential Democracy: Comparative Perspectives, vol. 1.  Johns Hopkins University Press, 1994.  In favor of presidential systems, he cites: Matthew Soberg Shugart and John M. Carey, Presidents and Assemblies: Constitutional Design and Electoral Dynamics. Cambridge University Press, 1992. p. 41-42.

Dahl does note that instability is more common in new democracies:

International comparisons

Dahl finds meaningful comparisons to the American Constitution only in other countries with similar conditions.  He says that there have been only 22 countries, including the United States which have been "steadily democratic" since 1950.  His book identifies the following constitutional attributes as important for comparison:

 Federalism.  Is the country a federal union of strong local governments (for example, states, provinces, cantons), or a unitary state?  In order to be federal, the subordinate units must be protected by constitutional law or practice, have substantial autonomy, and have substantial power to pass legislation.
 Bicameralism.  Are there two houses in the legislature, both with substantial powers?
 "Unequal" representation in upper house.  Are votes in one house of the legislature allocated by governmental subunit (for example, state, province, canton), not by population?
 Strong judicial review of national legislation: The power to declare unconstitutional laws duly passed by parliament and/or signed by the president.  (As distinct from the ability to strike down acts of subordinate governments, such as states or provinces.)
 Electoral system
 Single-Member District Plurality, also known as First Past the Post (FPTP).  There is one seat per district, and the candidate with the most votes (a plurality) wins.
 Proportional Representation (the fairest electoral system).  There are multiple seats for each voting district.  They are divided up in one of several ways, based on the proportion of the vote that individual candidates or political parties receive.
 Party lists
 Multi-member proportional (MMP)
 Single Transferable Vote (STV)
 Semi-PR
 French two-round system.
 Alternative vote (AV)
 Political parties
 Two-party system.  Two dominant parties control the executive and the vast majority of seats in the legislature.
 Multi-party system.  Three or more political parties exert significant influence in the legislature.
 Overall structure.  Is there a presidential system with a strong separation of powers between the executive and the legislature, or is there a parliamentary system?

List of countries steadily democratic since at least 1950
How Democratic compares the 23 stable, wealthy democracies on these criteria, summarized as follows:

Protecting democratic rights

Looking at Freedom House rankings, Dahl concludes that there is no discernible correlation between the seven constitutional features and ratings on political rights or civil rights among the 23 comparison countries.

Fairness and consensus

Dahl contrasts majoritarian governments, where the electoral system (for example, first-past-the-post) can grant a dominant group (or even a minority group) decisive control over the government, with proportional systems, where governmental control is more distributed.  He concludes that proportional systems are more "fair".

Proportional systems also do more to promote consensus-building, he claims, because of the need to build coalitions to form a majority.

Dahl considers the American system to be a hybrid, due to its bicameral legislature and strong separation of powers, and the strong executive, which he says does not fit the mold of either category.

Problem-solving effectiveness

Data from Patterns of Democracy (Yale University Press, 1999) by Arend Lijphart is presented in an appendix, which ranks the U.S. on a best-to-worst scale among a varying number of countries. Ranked criteria include economic growth, unemployment, inflation, economic inequality, women's representation, energy efficiency, incarceration rates, social spending, voter turnout, and foreign aid. Not all analysts would agree with Dahl that all of these criteria are appropriate measures of government effectiveness, and in some cases, there are political disagreements on whether a given indicator should be higher or lower.  In the rankings that are given, the United States is in the best third of one, the middle third of six, and the bottom third of eight.

Dahl states that difference in size, diversity, and economic affluence make attributing good performance on these measures to government effectiveness too difficult.  He does describe American performance as "mediocre," and concludes that changing the United States Constitution to a system resembling one of the other stable democracies would not necessarily negatively impact government performance.

See also
 Democratic deficit

References

2001 non-fiction books
Books about democracy
English-language books
Political science books
United States constitutional commentary